Kiikoinen (also ) is a former municipality of Finland.

It was located in the province of Western Finland and was part of the Satakunta region.

The municipality was unilingually Finnish. In 2013, it was consolidated with the municipality of Sastamala.

References

External links

Municipality of Kiikoinen – Official website

Municipalities of Satakunta
Populated places established in 1847
1847 establishments in the Russian Empire